Evaluation is the process of judging something or someone based on a set of standards.

Evaluation may also refer to:

Measurement or appraisal 
 Education:
 Competency evaluation (language), a means for teachers to determine the ability of their students
 Narrative evaluation, a form of performance measurement and feedback which can be used instead of grading
 Competency evaluation (law), an assessment of the ability of a defendant to understand and rationally participate in a court process

 Formation evaluation in petroleum exploration, used to determine the commercial-viability of a potential oil or gas field
 Human resources:
 Evaluation (workplace), a tool employers use to review the performance of an employee
 Performance evaluation, a method by which the job performance of an employee is evaluate
 Evaluation (basketball), a statistical formula used to rank basketball players in some European leagues
 Evaluation camp, a program in which athletes from Canadian universities are scouted by the Canadian Football League
 Monitoring and evaluation, a process that helps governments, international organizations and NGOs improve performance and achieve results
 Project management:
 Graphical Evaluation and Review Technique (GERT), a network analysis technique used in project management
 Program evaluation, a set of project management philosophies and techniques to determine if a program 'works'
 Program Evaluation and Review Technique (PERT), a model for project management invented by US Department of Defense's US Navy Special Projects Office

Computer science 
 Computer process to compute the value of an expression or subroutine argument:
 Eager evaluation or strict evaluation, the model in which an expression is evaluated as soon as it gets bound to a variable
 eval, a function which evaluates a string as though it were an expression, or executes multiple lines of code
 Evaluation strategy or reduction strategy, a set of rules for defining the evaluation of expressions under β-reduction
 Lazy evaluation, a technique of delaying computation of expressions until the results of the computation are needed
 Minimal evaluation or short circuit evaluation, an evaluation strategy in which an expression is only evaluated until the point where its final value is known
 Partial evaluation, a technique for program optimization by specialization
 Remote evaluation, the transmission of executable software programs from a client computer to a server computer for execution
 Evaluation function, used by game-playing programs to estimate the advantage of a position, also known as heuristic evaluation function or static evaluation function
 Appraisal of the quality of a project or product:
 Evaluation Assurance Level (EAL) of an IT product or system, a numerical grade assigned following the completion of a Common Criteria security evaluation
 Heuristic evaluation, a usability testing method to identify usability problems in a user interface (UI) design
 Standard Performance Evaluation Corporation (SPEC), a non-profit organization that aims to produce fair, impartial and meaningful benchmarks for computers

Groups or organizations 
 337th Test and Evaluation Squadron, the USAF's only B-1 operational test unit
 Australian Drug Evaluation Committee or ADEC, is a committee that provides independent scientific advice to the Australian Government regarding therapeutic drugs

 Defence Evaluation and Research Agency (DERA), a former part of the UK Ministry of Defence (MoD) up until 2001
 International Association for the Evaluation of Educational Achievement (IEA), an association of national research institutions and government research agencies related to education
 Operations Evaluation Department (OED), an independent unit within the World Bank

Other uses 
 Evaluation (journal), a quarterly peer-reviewed academic journal that covers in the field of evaluation
 Emergy evaluation, an accounting system in ecological economics, developed by Howard T. Odum and colleagues
 Immanent evaluation, a concept used by Gilles Deleuze in Nietzsche and Philosophy (1962)
 Realist Evaluation, a type of theory-driven evaluation method used in evaluating social programmes
 Registration, Evaluation and Authorisation of Chemicals (REACH), a legislation on chemical safety in the European Union
 Function evaluation, in mathematics

See also 
 Appraisal (disambiguation)
 

fr:Évaluation